Elsina Hidersha (15 March 198928 February 2011), better known by her stage name Emmy, was an Albanian singer. Her most notable hits were “Loje fjalesh” , "Pse të dua ty", "A ma jep", "Rastësisht u pamë", and "Let It Play".

Death
Hidersha was hit by a car allegedly driven by her ex-boyfriend, 47-year-old Kosovar businessman Aziz Kelmendi. The police said they suspect the incident was intentional and was a matter of jealousy. Reportedly Kelmendi was heavily intoxicated at the time of the incident. The incident happened in the late hours of 26 February 2011, when Hidersha was leaving a night club where she had been performing. Kelmendi allegedly followed and hit her with his car, although he denies the accusations. Hidersha was brought to the Military Hospital of Tirana suffering from severe brain damage and skull fractures. She lapsed into a coma and died on the morning of 28 February 2011.

On 24 May 2011, the Prosecutor closed the investigations stating Emmy's murder was not aforethought but instead, it was a negligent homicide and that Haziz Kelmendi will be held responsible.

Discography

Songs
"Loje fjalesh"
"Pse të dua ty"
"A ma jep"
"Rastësisht u pamë"
"Let It Play".

References

1989 births
2011 deaths
People from Skrapar
21st-century Albanian women singers
Pedestrian road incident deaths
Road incident deaths in Albania